Joseph Tan Yanquan (born 1962) is a Chinese Catholic priest and Metropolitan Archbishop of the Roman Catholic Archdiocese of Nanning since 2007.

Biography

He was ordained a priest in 1989. He was appointed Assistant Archbishop of the Roman Catholic Archdiocese of Nanning in 2003. He was elected Metropolitan Archbishop of the Roman Catholic Archdiocese of Nanning in 2007.

References

1962 births
Living people
21st-century Roman Catholic bishops in China